Forgan is an unincorporated hamlet located in Monet Rural Municipality No. 257, Saskatchewan, Canada. The Post Office was open from 1913 and defunct in 1986.

See also
 List of communities in Saskatchewan
 Hamlets of Saskatchewan

References

Populated places established in 1913
Unincorporated communities in Saskatchewan
Ghost towns in Saskatchewan
1913 establishments in Saskatchewan

nl:Forgan